The following is a list of the television networks and announcers who have broadcast college football's Peach Bowl throughout the years.

From 2006 to 2013, for sponsorship reasons, the game was known as the Chick-fil-A Bowl.

Television

Radio

References

Peach
Broadcasters
Peach Bowl
Peach Bowl
Peach Bowl
Peach Bowl
Peach Bowl